Network One was a small "independent" network, consisting of mostly low-powered television stations, scattered across the Continental United States, similar to Urban America Television, America One, or the better-known Ion (formerly PAX). The network officially launched on December 1, 1993, around the same time as Channel America and the American Independent Network, but shut down on November 13, 1997.

"Alternative" programming
Focusing on "alternative" programming, the network consisted of various B-Grade movies, beauty pageants, anime, and episodes of the series Night Flight  and  Bohemia Afterdark (a Portland, Oregon-based Music Video show). Classic episodes of the 1950s "hard-boiled" crime drama Lock-Up with Macdonald Carey were featured as well.  Commercials were filled with advertisements for 1-900 chat lines with a more mature focus.

List of affiliates 
Most affiliates have either gone independent, switched affiliations to another television network, or have simply gone off the air. Some, however, have simply turned into rebroadcasters for other stations.

See also 
 America One
 American Independent Network
 Channel America
 ION Television
 Independent station
 Urban America Television

References

Sources 
 Network One on the Web Archive

Defunct television networks in the United States
Television channels and stations established in 1993
Television channels and stations disestablished in 1997